Grêmio Recreativo Escola de Samba Unidos de Vila Isabel is a samba school in Rio de Janeiro. It was thrice champion of the Special Group and is currently headquartered in Boulevard 28 de Setembro in Vila Isabel.

The Unidos de Vila Isabel samba school was crowned the winner of the 2013 Rio Carnival on Wednesday for its attractive and colourful parade highlighting rural life and the customs of the Brazilian interior. Vila Isabel obtained 299.7 points out of a maximum score of 300.

History

Football is at the foundation of the 'Vila Isabel''', as there was in the neighborhood in 1945, a block known as Red and White. The removal of some components has resulted in the creation of a football team with the colors blue and white, later transformed into a new carnival. Antonio Fernandes da Silveira, the "China", registered the company as the União Geral das Escolas de Samba, thus on April 4 of 1946, the school opened its doors.

The home of "China", the first president of the school, served until 1958 as headquarters of the school. The tests were performed in Field Andaraí. The first plot of the Village, From Slave to Queen, was performed by only 100 members in Onze Square: 27 percussionists, 13 Bahia and another 50 people. Paulo Brazão, one of the founders of the school, was one of the biggest winners of the theme song Vila Isabel. In 1960, the school won first place in Group 3, with the plot Poet of the Slaves.One of the best known figures of the school is, undoubtedly, Martinho da Vila. His entry into the guild was in 1965; it was part of the Samba School Learners of Boca do Mato and it was off to the Empire Serrano, with an invitation to join the wing of the Vila Isabel composers. In the new school, Martin has restructured the composition of the songs and the plots of the parade yearly, with the introduction of softer lyrics and melodies. In the carnival of 1967, Martinho da Vila composed Carnival of Illusions, in 1968 Four Centuries of Fashion and Costumes, in 1969 Iaiá Cais Gold, and in 1970, Glory Gaúchas.

In 1979, the village was victorious in Group 1B, with a plot made by Yedda Pinheiro, talking about the golden years of Carlos Machado. It was the first time a school honored a major culture still alive. It is commonplace, but this was the first time this was done.

In the special group, Vila Isabel won only their first championship in 1988, with the parade theme song Kizomba, a festa da raça. The parade marked the samba runway, abusing alternative materials such as straw and sisal, and the claw of school members. For many who know the school parades, this was perhaps the best show ever known. Unfortunately, due to a severe storm, which left the city of Rio de Janeiro in a state of emergency, the Parade of Champions was not performed.

After the victory of 1988, the school achieved a good result with Law is law in 1989 (4th place), in a year when the committee was composed of pregnant women. But in the 1990s, the school ranged from 7th to 12th place. In 2000, however, the Vila Isabel was in 13th place, down to the Access Group A. In 2002, with a story about Nilton Santos, the village was prevented from going up to the Special Group by the error of a judge, who gave the village a lower score instead of a 10, which would be given to União da Ilha. Thus, the Acadêmicos de Santa Cruz was champion.

In 2004, with a story about the city of Paraty, the village returned to become champion of the Access Group, beating the favorite Santa Cruz, and scholars of Rocinha. In 2005 with Joãosnho Trinta on the committee, who suffered a stroke and could not continue working, the village brought a story about ships that got 10th place.

After spending years without court trials, Ru, president of the school, arranged for the school hall Ecuador, which lies on Boulevard 28 de Setembro and the street Rocha Fragoso, to relinquish its gymnasium. Currently the school has a block of tests located in the Boulevard, in what was the final season of the tramway, which was the car park and garage Detran, the former CTC.

In 2006, Vila Isabel Avenue used the plot "Soy loco por ti America - The town sings the Latin civilization, with the carnavalesco (carnival planner) Alexandre Louzada, and got his second title, after much suffering in the calculation. With an infectious chorus, the theme song of the Vila Isabel was the one that made the bleachers sing the most, and curiously, was what determined the title. The company PDVSA, Venezuela's state oil company, funded the carnival of Vila Isabel with a donation of $900 thousand. However, according to a report of "Official in Brazil" on March 3, 2006, Venezuelan authorities investigated the sponsorship and its true value, as there are opinions that the amount was between US$450 to $2 million. The Venezuelan morning Report reported on its cover more than 500 people traveled to Rio de Janeiro, with all expenses paid by PDVSA to cheer the parade of Vila Isabel. In 2007, the plot talked about the Metamorphoses, by Cid Carvalho, who debuted a solo career, ending in 6th position.

In the carnival of 2008, talking about the Workers of Brazil, the village had a rich and visually perfect parade. However, a manoeuvre error in the last float affected the school, without reducing the brilliance of the new Queen of battery (Natalia Guimaraes).

In the carnival of 2009, the village spoke about the centenary of the Theatro Municipal do Rio de Janeiro, with the theme In this Stage of Folia, My Village Announces: Municipal Theater, the Centenary Wonder, authored by the carnival planner Alex de Souza, which in partnership with the controversial Paulo Barros, finished in 4th place.

For the carnival of 2010, the village spoke about the centenary of Noel Rosa, with the plot "Noel: the presence of the poet's Village''," with a samba composed by Martinho da Vila, the first time since 1993. In the end, the school was in 4th place.

Classifications

References

External links

  

Samba schools of Rio de Janeiro
1945 establishments in Brazil